Provincial road N229 is a Dutch provincial road.

See also

References

External links

229
229